Al-Tah, Idlib  is a Syrian town located in Hish Nahiyah in Maarrat al-Nu'man District, Idlib.  According to the Syria Central Bureau of Statistics (CBS), Al-Tah, Idlib had a population of 8606 in the 2004 census.

References 

Populated places in Maarat al-Numan District
Populated places in Syria